Busengo may mean one of the following:

 Busengo, Democratic Republic of the Congo
 Busengo, Rwanda
 Busengo, Uganda